Xenocretosuchus is an extinct genus of tritylodont therapsids from the Aptian (Early Cretaceous) Ilek Formation of Siberia, in the Russian Federation. The type species, X. sibiricus, is known only from dental elements, as is X. kolossovi, described from the Batylykh Formation in 2008. Some authors have treated these species as part of the genus Stereognathus, otherwise known from the Middle Jurassic of Britain But this is rejected by other authors.

Alongside Montirictus and Fossiomanus, it is amongst the latest known non-mammaliform-synapsid, extending their range to the Early Cretaceous.

References

Early Cretaceous synapsids
Prehistoric cynodont genera
Extinct animals of Russia
Tritylodontids
Fossil taxa described in 1999